Crambus dedalus is a moth in the family Crambidae. It was described by Graziano Bassi in 2000. It is found in Ethiopia.

References

Endemic fauna of Ethiopia
Crambini
Moths described in 2000
Moths of Africa